Karrharde Frisian is a dialect of the North Frisian language spoken in the municipalities of Stedesand and Enge-Sande in the German Amt of Südtondern (formerly Karrharde) in the district of Nordfriesland, Schleswig-Holstein. It is a mainland dialect of North Frisian. The language is in danger of extinction, having a dwindling number of native speakers and no formal schooling offered to educate younger speakers.

References

North Frisian language